Michael Dean or Mike Dean may refer to:

Michael Dean (artist) (born 1977), British artist
Michael Dean (broadcaster) (1933–2015), New Zealand-born television presenter, active also in the UK and Australia
 Michael Dean (cricketer) (born 1972), English cricketer
 Michael Dean (journalist), editor-in-chief of The Comics Journal for Fantagraphics Books
 Michael Lee Dean, American clarinetist and university professor
 Mike Dean, original drummer for Gang Green
 Mike Dean (musician) (born 1963), American bassist and singer with Corrosion of Conformity
 Mike Dean (politician) (born 1955), American politician
 Mike Dean (record producer) (born 1965), American hip hop producer
 Mike Dean (referee) (born 1968), English Premier League football referee

See also
 Michael Deane (disambiguation)
Mickey Deans (1934–2003), American discothèque manager and husband of Judy Garland
"Michel Dean", the individually named gap between the two easternmost Seven Sisters cliffs in Sussex